Corporate Memphis (alternative names: Alegria Art, Big Tech Art, or Flat Art) is a term used to describe a flat, geometric art style, widely associated with Big Tech illustrations in the late 2010s and early 2020s. It has been criticized by some as uninspired or dystopian, though some illustrators have defended the style, pointing at what they claim to be its art-historical legitimacy.

Origins 
Flat art developed out of the rise of vector graphic programs, and a nostalgia for midcentury modern illustration. It began to trend in editorial illustration and especially the tech industry, which relied on simple, scalable illustrations to fill white space and add character to apps and web pages. The style was widely popularized when Facebook introduced Alegria, an illustration system commissioned from design agency Buck Studios and illustrator Xoana Herrera in 2017.

The name Corporate Memphis originated from the title of an Are.na board that collected early examples, and is a reference to the Memphis Group, a 1980s design group known for bright colors, childish patterns, and geometric shapes.

Visual characteristics 

Common motifs are flat human characters in action, with disproportionate features such as long and bendy limbs, small torsos, minimal or no facial features, and bright colors without any blending. Facebook's Alegria uses non-representational skin colors such as blues and purples in order to feel universal, though some artists working in the style opt for more realistic skin colors and features to show diversity.

Reception 
Once Facebook adopted the style, the sudden ubiquity of vector graphics led to a critical backlash. The style has been criticized for being generic, lazy, overused, and attempting to sanitize public perception of big tech companies by presenting human interaction in utopian optimism. Criticism of the art style is often rooted in larger anxieties about the creative industry under capitalism and neoliberalism. Some have argued that, despite the criticism, Corporate Memphis has unexpected depth and variety, and deserves to be understood on its own merits beyond an association with tech dystopias.

References 

Illustration
Art movements
Design
Advertising
Minimalism